The 25th Indiana Volunteer Infantry Regiment was an infantry regiment that served in the Union Army during the American Civil War.

Service
The 25th Indiana Volunteer Infantry was organized at Evansville, Indiana, on August 19, 1861.
Battle of Fort Donelson
Battle of Shiloh
Siege of Corinth
Battle of Hatchie's Bridge
Battle of Davis Mills
Battle of Hatchie's Bridge
Atlanta Campaign
Battle of Jonesboro
Sherman's March to the Sea
Battle of Bentonville
The regiment mustered out of service on July 17, 1865.

Total strength and casualties
The regiment lost 7 officers and 81 enlisted men killed in action or died of wounds and 3 officers and 270 enlisted men  who died of disease, for a total of 361 fatalities.

Commanders
 Colonel James Clifford Veatch
 Colonel William Henry Morgan

See also

 List of Indiana Civil War regiments
 Indiana in the Civil War

References

External links

Units and formations of the Union Army from Indiana
1861 establishments in Indiana
Military units and formations established in 1861
Military units and formations disestablished in 1865